Total Hublak is an Indian Marathi language comedy series aired on Zee Marathi from 15 June 2020 during lockdown period. It starred Kiran Gaikwad and Monalisa Bagal in lead roles. It is produced by Tejpal Wagh under the banner of Waghoba Production.

Cast 
 Kiran Gaikwad
 Monalisa Bagal
 Rahul Magdum
 Purva Shinde
 Amarnath Kharade
 Sachin Hagavane-Patil
 Nilima Kamane
 Mahesh Jadhav
 Kiran Mane

References

External links 
 Total Hublak at ZEE5

Marathi-language television shows
2020 Indian television series debuts
Zee Marathi original programming
2020 Indian television series endings